Dabirul Islam (born 29 September 1948) is a Bangladesh Awami League politician and the incumbent Jatiya Sangsad member representing from the Thakurgaon-2 constituency since 1996, during 1991–1996 and 1986–1988. He is chairman of the Standing Committee on Ministry of Chittagong Hill Tracts Affairs. He is a 7-term Jatiya Sangsad member representing the Thakurgaon-2 constituency.

Career
Islam is elected to Parliament from Thakurgaon-2 form Bangladesh Awami League. He is a 7-term member of parliament elected from Thakurgaon-2.  In the northern part of Bangladesh nobody won more than six times elections But Dabirul Islam has set an example of winning for 7 times. He served as the chairman of the Standing Committee on Ministry of Housing and Public Works , Standing Committee on Ministry of Social Welfare and Standing Committee on Ministry of Science and Technology. He owns Ranbag Islami Tea Estate Company. He is the president of Thakurgaon district Awami League.

Controversy
Islam was accused of trying to forcibly occupy the properties of minority Hindu groups near his tea estate. Over 10 Hindu people were injured in attacks by his men. The police were accused of not registering cases against him because his party is in power. His son was accused of leading the attacks to occupy land belonging to Hindu families in Baliadangi, Thakurgaon, the area borders India. Reports of Bangladesh Intelligence agencies, local police and minority advocacy group Bangladesh Hindu Buddhist Christian Unity Council found involvement of Islam in the land grabbing.

References

1948 births
Living people
People from Thakurgaon District
Awami League politicians
3rd Jatiya Sangsad members
5th Jatiya Sangsad members
7th Jatiya Sangsad members
8th Jatiya Sangsad members
9th Jatiya Sangsad members
10th Jatiya Sangsad members
11th Jatiya Sangsad members
Place of birth missing (living people)